Baroness Margarethe von Bülow (1860–1884) was a German novelist. She died prematurely while saving a drowning child.

Life
Margarethe Freifräulein von Bülow was born into the Bülow family in Berlin on February 23, 1860. She was the daughter of diplomat Hugo Freiherr von Bülow. She grew up in various countries, including England. She was close to her elder sister, the novelist Frieda von Bülow. She was also a literary protégé of the literary critic and satirist Fritz Mauthner.

Von Bülow drowned in Berlin on January 2, 1884, after saving the life of a boy who had fallen through the ice whil skating on the Rummelsburger See lake. Mauthner and her sister Frieda edited her writings for posthumous publication.

Works
 Novellen. Berlin: Hertz Verlag, 1885
 Jonas Briccius: Erzählung. Leipzig: Grunow Verlag, 1886.
 Aus der Chronik derer von Riffelshausen: Erzählung. Leipzig: Grunow Verlag, 1887.
 Neue Novellen. Berlin: Verlag Walther & Apolant, 1890.
 Novellen einer Frühvollendeten: Ausgewähltes: Mit einer Einleitung von Adolf Bartels. Leipzig: R. Voigtländer's Verlag, 1920.

References

1860 births
1884 deaths
19th-century German novelists
German women novelists
German baronesses
Margarethe